Solstice is a superhero published by DC Comics. The character has appeared as a new member in DC's long-running Teen Titans comic book series, and was created by JT Krul and Nicola Scott. Krul has described the character as being "a positive spirit - influenced by the various cultures she’s encountered during her travels throughout the world. She embraces life and all the adventure and experiences it offers."

Publication history
Solstice made her first appearance in Teen Titans (vol. 3) #88 in October 2010. The character was not named, but was shown alongside the new Aqualad as part of a montage showing future events that would affect the team in the coming issues. She made her first speaking appearance in the following issue, where her civilian name was given. The character made her first appearance as Solstice in Wonder Girl (vol. 2) #1, a one-shot comic released by DC in January 2011. Writer JT Krul has confirmed that Solstice will be a regular character in the Teen Titans book.

Fictional character biography
The daughter of two prominent archaeologists named Vijay and Rani, Kiran Singh is a teenager from Delhi, India. While visiting London, England with her parents in order to attend an archaeological conference, Kiran meets and befriends Cassie Sandsmark, who like Kiran is the child of a noted archaeologist. While their parents attend a lecture, Kiran and Cassie explore a nearby museum exhibit, just before it is attacked by a supervillain named Lady Zand. Just as Cassie reveals herself to be the superheroine known as Wonder Girl, Kiran creates a golden costume for herself and tells Cassie to call her "Solstice". Together, the two heroines fight off Lady Zand's army of rock creatures, but the villainess herself flees before they can capture her. After Zand's escape, Kiran departs from the museum with her parents, who are obviously aware that their daughter possesses superhuman abilities.

Kiran later appears at an archaeological dig in Mohenjo-daro, where her parents are now working alongside Helena Sandsmark, Cassie's mother. After nightfall, Vijay and Rani go out for a walk, but mysteriously disappear without telling anyone. Kiran is shown to be concerned, and begins using her abilities to search the dark for her parents. After an adventure with the Teen Titans, Kiran rescues her family and is invited to join the team. She remains with the team for their final adventure, where they face the Legion of Doom. She and Miss Martian work together to defeat Sun Girl.

Following the events of Flashpoint, history is rewritten as part of The New 52 so that the incarnation of the Teen Titans Kiran joined never existed. However, Red Robin is shown watching a news report from India showing Kiran using her powers.

In the following issue, Kiran is shown to be incarcerated in the same facility as Kid Flash. Her powers appear to have been altered by N.O.W.H.E.R.E, giving her body a black, smokey appearance with light shining through various cracks and openings. Despite the changes and abuse she suffered however, she seems to retain her good and hopeful nature. She joined the new incarnation of Teen Titans.

During the Heroes in Crisis storyline, Solstice was seen discussing how long she is in while being traumatized. She is presumably dead after her return from the 31st Century.

In the Watchmen sequel Doomsday Clock, Solstice was listed as being part of India's sanctioned superhero team called the Doomed.

Powers and abilities
The extent of Solstice's abilities are currently unknown, but she has displayed the ability to generate bright, golden blasts of light from her hands, as well as generate concussive blasts of light energy. Kiran also possesses a tattoo on her right wrist, which glows whenever she uses her abilities. Her costume itself appears to be made of solid light, and Kiran is able to generate the costume around her body at will, as well as cause it to dissipate when she needs to return to her civilian identity. During the battle with Lady Zand, she also displays the power of flight, though how she flies has not yet been explained.

Following the reboot, Solstice retains all of her abilities, but her body has been altered to resemble black smoke that emits blue light, shining through her eyes, mouth, and cracks in her skin. It could possibly represent the summer solstice and the winter solstice.

References

Comics characters introduced in 2010
DC Comics female superheroes
Indian superheroes
DC Comics metahumans
Fictional characters who can manipulate light